Island Lake is an unincorporated community is located in the town of Big Bend, in Rusk County, Wisconsin, United States.

Originally known as Burpee's Place, Island Lake is located along Wisconsin Highway 40, on the northeast shore of Island Lake, 10 miles south of the village of Bruce.

The community has a Church of Christ, along with the adjacent Island Lake Cemetery. The Big Bend Town Hall is located within the community.

Island Lake is located 19 miles southwest of Ladysmith.

References

Unincorporated communities in Rusk County, Wisconsin
Unincorporated communities in Wisconsin